The men's 400 metres at the 1962 European Athletics Championships was held in Belgrade, then Yugoslavia, at JNA Stadium on 12, 13, and 14 September 1962.

Medalists

Results

Final
14 September

Semi-finals
13 September

Semi-final 1

Semi-final 2

Semi-final 3

Heats
12 September

Heat 1

Heat 2

Heat 3

Heat 4

Heat 5

Heat 6

Participation
According to an unofficial count, 24 athletes from 14 countries participated in the event.

 (1)
 (1)
 (1)
 (1)
 (3)
 (1)
 (2)
 (2)
 (3)
 (1)
 (1)
 (3)
 (2)
 (2)

References

400 metres
400 metres at the European Athletics Championships